The Bakoy or Bakoye River is a river in West Africa. It runs through Guinea and Mali and joins with the Bafing River to form the Sénégal River at Bafoulabé in the Kayes Region of western Mali. In Manding languages, Bakoye signifies 'white river', Bafing 'black river' and Baloué 'red river'.

The source of the Bakoy is at an elevation of 760 m in the granite Monts Ménien to the northwest of Siguiri in Guinea. The river flows north and forms part of the international border between Guinea and Mali. It then meanders across the Manding Plateau and joins its principal affluent, the Baloué, which rises to the west of Bamako. The Bakoy is 560 km in length and drains a basin of around 85,600 km2. The river is seasonal with a maximum flow in September after the start of the West African Monsoon and almost no flow between January and June. The large year-to-year variation in the intensity of the West African Monsoon gives rise to large changes in the discharge of the Bakoy River. For the exceptionally dry year of 1972, the average flow at the Oualia gauging station, 54 km upstream of Bafoulabé, was only 30 m3/s while in 1958 the value was 260 m3/s. The average flow over the period 1951-1978 was 156 m3/s corresponding to an annual discharge of 4.9 km3. At Bafoulabé the average discharge of the Bakoy is between a third and a half of that of the Bafing.

References

Rivers of Mali
Rivers of Guinea
Senegal River
International rivers of Africa
Guinea–Mali border
Border rivers